Sucular is a  village in Tarsus district of Mersin Province, Turkey. At  it is situated in Çukurova  (Cilicia of the antiquity) . Berdan Dam reservoir is to the east and  the Turkish state highway  is to the south of the village. The population of the village was 273  as of 2012. The major crop of the village is grape.

References

Villages in Tarsus District